Kevin Abley (born 24 March 1935) was an Australian rules footballer who played in the South Australian National Football League with the Glenelg Football Club.

Kevin Abley was born on 24 March 1935, in Box Hill, Victoria, Australia. He came to Adelaide in the early stages of 1950 when he was 15 years of age. He lived with his family which included his brother, and Port Adelaide Magpie legend John Abley.  He played 173 games for Glenelg, mainly at full-back and represented South Australia on 4 occasions in interstate matches against Victoria.

References

1935 births
Living people
Glenelg Football Club players
Australian rules footballers from Melbourne
People from Box Hill, Victoria
Australian rules footballers from Adelaide